Məzrəli may refer to:
Məzrəli, Imishli, Azerbaijan
Məzrəli, Saatly, Azerbaijan